Huenes Marcelo Lemos (Iguatama, born 5 December 1981), known as Mineiro, is a Brazilian footballer who plays for Sport Club Internacional's reserves team.

Biography
Born in Iguatama, Minas Gerais, Mineiro played for minor clubs in Brazil in his early career. He signed a -year contract with ADAP in July 2003 and loaned to CSA from April to July 2006, which he finished as the runner-up of 2006 League of Alagoas state.

SC Internacional
Mineiro then signed by Internacional in short-term contract, which he played for its B team at 2006 Copa FGF. He signed a new 5-year contract in December 2006. and played for Inter B at 2007 League of Rio Grande do Sul Second Division. He also played 6 matches at 2007 Campeonato Brasileiro Série A and 2007 Recopa Sudamericana for the first team. In the second half of 2007 season, he also played in 2007 Copa FGF.

In January 2008 he was loaned to J1 League club Gamba Osaka. and only played twice in the league, in although wore no.3 shirt. In December the club decided not to extend the loan.

In January 2009 he was loaned to Juventude, competitor of League of Rio Grande do Sul state He also played at 2009 Campeonato Brasileiro Série B.

In the next season, he was loaned to a city "rival" Porto Alegre FC in 6 months deal, for 2010 League of Rio Grande do Sul state. He returned to Inter in May. He then played for Inter B at 2010 Copa FGF and winning the cup.

He played 2 games for Inter in 2011 season before left on loan to Criciúma along with Kléber, Wagner Libano and Talles Cunha.

Honours
Recopa Sudamericana: 2007
Pan-Pacific Championship: 2008
AFC Champions League: 2008
Copa FGF: 2010

References

Photo of Mineiro

External links
 
  
 Mineiro at Globoesporte 
 Mineiro at SC Internacional 
 Mineiro at Futpedia 
 
 

Brazilian footballers
J1 League players
Adap Galo Maringá Football Club players
Centro Sportivo Alagoano players
Sport Club Internacional players
Gamba Osaka players
Esporte Clube Juventude players
Porto Alegre Futebol Clube players
Criciúma Esporte Clube players
Association football central defenders
Brazilian expatriate footballers
Brazilian expatriate sportspeople in Japan
Expatriate footballers in Japan
Sportspeople from Minas Gerais
1981 births
Living people